Sinoy Hill is an island in the Mumbai harbour. In 2005, Chief Minister Vilasrao Deshmukh had inspected the location as a site for the location of a statue in honour of Shivaji, a revered Maratha king.

References

PWD's Vision of Shivaji, Times of India—Mumbai, pg4, Nauzer Bharucha/TNN, 2008-07-10

Islands of Mumbai
Islands of India
Uninhabited islands of India